Mary Louise Carew Armstrong was an American athlete who competed in sprinting events.

Life 
She was born in Medford, Massachusetts. She married William "Bud" Armstrong in 1938. She died in Framingham, Massachusetts.

Athletics Career 
Mary Carew achieved four straight victories in the AAU indoor 40y, between 1929 and 1932, with her winning time of 5.2 in 1930 and 1931 equalling the world indoor record. Additionally, she won the AAU outdoor 50y in 1930.

She competed for the United States in the 1932 Summer Olympics held in Los Angeles, as the lead-off runner in the 4 x 100 metres. Alongside her teammates Evelyn Furtsch, Annette Rogers and 100m bronze medalist Wilhelmina von Bremen, she won a gold medal and her team set a joint world record (as per the rules of the time) of 47.0, with Canada.

References

1913 births
2002 deaths
Sportspeople from Medford, Massachusetts
American female sprinters
Olympic gold medalists for the United States in track and field
Athletes (track and field) at the 1932 Summer Olympics
Medalists at the 1932 Summer Olympics
USA Indoor Track and Field Championships winners
20th-century American women
Olympic female sprinters